Panasonic Lumix DMC-GF1 was introduced in September 2009 as the third camera in Panasonic's Lumix G-series, using the Micro Four Thirds system. It was the first model in the "GF" line, which is primarily distinguished from the other Lumix G cameras by the lack of an integrated electronic viewfinder.

Features
The design of the DMC-GF1 is similar to that of the Olympus E-P1 which was introduced a few months earlier. The GF1 is 35% smaller than earlier G models. It has the same 12.1 megapixel sensor as the DMC-G1, 1280 × 720 HD recording in AVCHD Lite format, an optional hot-shoe mounted electronic viewfinder, and a 3-inch LCD with 460,000 dots. It was announced at the 2009 Internationale Funkausstellung Berlin consumer electronics exhibition. This model in the Lumix range was claimed by Panasonic as the world's smallest and lightest system digital camera with a built-in flash capability.

Although the GF1 is small it still offers many advanced features such as its high definition video recording capability. It offers most of the features of the larger G1, including high speed contrast detect autofocus and an identical sensor.

Successor model 

The GF1's successor, the Panasonic Lumix DMC-GF2 was announced in November 2010. The GF line has since been extended with the Panasonic Lumix DMC-GF3 (announced in June 2011), the Panasonic Lumix DMC-GF5 (announced in April 2012) and the Panasonic Lumix DMC-GF6 (announced in April 2013). Many enthusiasts decried the move away from the GF1's button driven interface and the omission of the top control dial in the GF2 and subsequent models. Because of this some feel that the Panasonic Lumix DMC-GX1 is the GF1's "spiritual successor".

References

External links

Panasonic Lumix DMC-GF1 Product Page
Panasonic Lumix DMC-GF1 Product Page from Wayback Machine
Panasonic Lumix DMC-GF1 Press Release
Accessories compatible with the Panasonic Lumix DMC-GF1
Panasonic Lumix DMC-GF1 Photos
Rumored Micro Four Thirds Panasonic GF1 gets pictured
Panasonic unveils DMC-GF1 Micro four-thirds camera
Panasonic Lumix GF1 Review at Dpreview
Hands On with Panasonic's Tiny SLR
The Vimeo Panasonic DMC-GF1 Group 
Time Lapse Video with the Panasonic DMC-GF1

GF1